This is a list of the major royal families and their allies in the Arabian Peninsula in the 20th century.
 Al Saud, Rulers of Nejd from the 18th century. Now rulers of Saudi Arabia
 House of Rashīd,  the House of Rasheed were a historic Arabian dynasty ruling Hail, northern Nejd, between 1836–1921.
 Al ash-Sheikh, Saudi Arabia's leading religious family, allied to Al Saud.
 Al Hashim, previously rulers of Hejaz after the fall of the Ottoman Empire, quickly deposed by Al Saud in 1926 but moved to the north and ruled Iraq until 1958 and still rules Jordan.
 Al-Sabah, the rulers of Kuwait.
 Al Thani, the rulers of Qatar originally from Nejd.
 Al Khalifah, the rulers of Bahrain.
 Al Qasimi, formerly known as Al Qawasim tribe, the rulers of Sharjah and Ras Al Khaimah descend from this line.
 Al Nuaimi, the rulers of Ajman descend from this line.
Al Nahyan, the rulers of Abu Dhabi descend from this line.
 Al Maktoum, the rulers of Dubai descend from this line.
 Al Mualla, the rulers of Umm al Quwain descend from this line.
 Al Sharqi, the rulers of Fujairah descend from this line.
 House of al-Said, the royal family of Oman
 Al Bu Sa'id, the ruling branch of the al-Sa'id dynasty in Oman
 House of al-Rassid, The Imams of Yemen and later also the Kings of Yemen ruling from 897 to 1962.
 House of Al-Daweesh the ruling branch of Al Mutair Tribe ruled Najid for a time

See also
 Tribes of Arabia

References

Arab groups
Arabian houses
Arabian